Injil (Enjil) is a village and the center of the Injil District in Herat Province, Afghanistan.

References

See also
Herat Province

Populated places in Herat Province